The Copa do Brasil 1999 was the 11th staging of the Copa do Brasil.

The competition started on January 28, 1999, and concluded on June 27, 1999, with the second leg of the final, held at the Estádio do Maracanã in Rio de Janeiro, in which Juventude lifted the trophy for the first time with a 0-0 draw with Botafogo.

Romário, of Flamengo, and Dejan Petković, of Vitória, with 7 goals each, were the competition's topscorers.

Format
The competition was disputed by 65 clubs in a knock-out format where all rounds were played over two legs and the away goals rule was used, with the exception of the preliminary match, which was played in a single match, and in the first two rounds if the away team won the first leg with an advantage of at least two goals, the second leg was not played and the club automatically qualified to the next round.

Competition stages

References
 Copa do Brasil 1999 at RSSSF
Enciclopédia do Futebol Brasileiro, Volume 2 - Lance, Rio de Janeiro: Aretê Editorial S/A, 2001.

1999 domestic association football cups
1999
1999 in Brazilian football